Dream Weapon is the third studio album by American experimental metal band Genghis Tron, released on March 26, 2021. The album is the band's first studio album since 2008's Board Up the House and the first with vocalist Tony Wolski and drummer Nick Yacyshyn, marking the first time the band has ever used a drummer.

Keyboardist Michael Sochynsky described the album's sound as having a "more meditative, hypnotic, and maybe psychedelic" direction. He also added that the album would have no blast beats or "Nintendocore" parts.

It was elected by PopMatters as the 2nd best progressive metal album of 2021.

Background
Genghis Tron's last album, Board Up the House, was released in 2008 to critical acclaim. The band released a series of remix EPs for the album in 2008 and 2009. In late 2010 on MySpace, the band members announced that they would be going on hiatus, but would return with new music once they started playing together again. Nearly after ten years of silence, the band announced they were returning from hiatus and would be recording a new album with Converge guitarist Kurt Ballou, who also produced the band's previous two albums. The reunited lineup features original members Hamilton Jordan (guitar) and Michael Sochynsky (keyboards, programming) along with new members Tony Wolski on vocals, replacing Mookie Singerman, and Nick Yacyshyn on drums, with the band having previously used a drum machine on previous releases.

A music video was released for the title track and lead single "Dream Weapon" on January 26, 2021. The video was directed by Mount Emult. "Ritual Circle" was released as the album's second single on February 16. Axl Rosenberg of MetalSucks favorably compared the track to Tangerine Dream, Chvrches and Justin Broadrick.

Track listing

Personnel
Genghis Tron
Tony Wolski – vocals
Hamilton Jordan – guitar
Michael Sochynsky – keyboards, programming
Nick Yacyshyn – drums

Production
Kurt Ballou – producer
Ben Chisholm – engineering and additional production
J.J. Heath – engineering and additional production
Heba Kadry – mastering

References

2021 albums
Genghis Tron albums
Relapse Records albums
Albums produced by Kurt Ballou